Folquet de Marselha, alternatively Folquet de Marseille, Foulques de Toulouse, Fulk of Toulouse (c. 1150 – 25 December 1231) came from a Genoese merchant family who lived in Marseille. He is known as a trobadour, and then as a fiercely anti-Cathar bishop of Toulouse.

Troubadour

Initially famed as a troubadour, he began composing songs in the 1170s and was known to Raymond Geoffrey II of Marseille, Richard Coeur de Lion, Raymond V of Toulouse, Raimond-Roger of Foix, Alfonso II of Aragon and William VIII of Montpellier.  He is known primarily for his love songs, which were lauded by Dante; there are 14 surviving cansos, one tenson, one lament, one invective, three crusading songs and possibly one religious song (although its authorship is disputed).  Like many other troubadours, he was later credited by the Biographies des Troubadours to have conducted love affairs with the various noblewomen about whom he sang (allegedly causing William VIII to divorce his wife, Eudocia Comnena), but all evidence suggests that Folquet's early life was considerably more prosaic and in keeping with his status as a wealthy citizen.  A contemporary, John of Garlande, later described him as "renowned on account of his spouse, his progeny, and his home," all marks of bourgeois respectability.

Bishop

Folquet's life and career abruptly changed around 1195 when he experienced a profound religious conversion and decided to renounce his former life.  He joined the strict Cistercian Order, entering the monastery of Thoronet (Var, France), and appears to have placed his wife and two sons in monastic institutions as well.  He soon rose in prominence and was elected abbot of Thoronet which allowed him to help found the sister house of Géménos to house women, quite possibly including his wife.

He was elected Bishop of Toulouse in 1205, after two Cistercian Papal legates had been sent to the region to reform it.  Pope Innocent III was particularly concerned by the prevalence of both heresy and episcopal corruption in the Languedoc and used the Cistercians to combat both.  The legates had deposed the previous Bishop, Raimon de Rabastens, and were probably instrumental in arranging Folquet's nomination for the position.

As Bishop of Toulouse, Folquet (now traditionally referred to by his proper name, Foulques, Fulk, or Folc, instead of the diminutive Folquet) took a very active role in combatting heresy.  Throughout his episcopal career he sought to create and encourage outlets for religious enthusiasm that were Catholic in an effort to woo believers away from preachers of heresy (primarily Cathar and Waldensian).  In 1206 he created what would become the convent of Prouille to offer women a religious community that would rival (and, where necessary, replace) those of the Cathars. He participated in the initial preaching mission of Saint Dominic that was led by Dominic's superior, Bishop Diego of Osma. He continued to support this new form of preaching after Bishop Diego's death by backing Dominic and his followers, eventually allotting the nascent Dominicans property and a portion of the tithes of Toulouse to ensure their continued success.

Figure of the Albigensian Crusade
Bishop Foulques had tumultuous relations with his diocese, primarily on account of his support of the Albigensian Crusade, which was popularly perceived as a war of aggression against the region.  Hated by many Toulousains and by Count Raymond VI of Toulouse he left Toulouse on 2 April 1211, after the crusaders laid siege to Lavaur. Soon afterwards he instructed all clerics to leave the city. He was present at the siege in April–May 1211; he then travelled north to France, where he preached the Crusade alongside Guy of les Vaux-de-Cernay (the abbot of the Vaux-de-Cernay Abbey). He then returned to the south, participating in the Council of Pamiers in November 1212, in the Council of Lavaur in January 1213, in the meeting with Peter II of Aragon on 14 January 1213, at the Battle of Muret on 12 September 1213, and at the Council of Montpellier in January 1215. There he was instructed by the Papal legate, Peter of Benevento, to take possession of the Château Narbonnais, the Count's residence, at Toulouse; thus he finally returned to the city in February 1215.

In July 1215 Foulques issued a diocesan letter instituting Dominic's brotherhood of preachers (which eventually became the Dominican Order). In November 1215 he and Dominic, with Guy of Montfort, were in Rome at the Fourth Lateran Council.

After the Toulousains revolted in August 1216 against their new ruler, Simon de Montfort, 5th Earl of Leicester, and Foulques' negotiated settlement led to further violence, he tried to relinquish his position, claiming that it was impossible to manage the diocese, but his requests to the pope were refused. In October 1217, when Simon was besieging Toulouse once more, he sent a group of sympathisers to Paris to plead for the help of king Philippe-Auguste. This group included Simon's wife, the countess Alix de Montmorency, as well as Foulques. They began their journey clandestinely, "through the forest", to avoid attacks by faidits (exiled). They returned more flamboyantly, in May 1218, bringing a party of new Crusaders including the dashing Amaury de Craon.

Foulques spent much of the following decade outside his diocese, assisting the crusading army and the Church's attempts to bring order to the region. He was at the Council of Sens in 1223.

After the Peace of Paris finally ended the crusade in 1229, Foulques returned to Toulouse and began to construct the institutions that were designed to combat heresy in the region.  He helped to create the University of Toulouse and administered the newly created Episcopal Inquisition.  He died in 1231 and was buried, beside the tomb of William VII of Montpellier, at the abbey of Grandselves, near Toulouse, where his sons, Ildefonsus and Petrus had been abbots.

Notes

Folquet's works
 Stanislaw Stronski, Le troubadour Folquet de Marseille. Kraków: Académie des Sciences, 1910.
 Texts of Folquet's poems (in Occitan)
 His diocesan letter of 1215 approving Dominic's brotherhood of preachers (French translation of the Latin original)

Historical sources

 pp. 470–484.
 (Reprinted: Toulouse: Le Pérégrinateur, 1996)

References
Stronski, S. (Ed.) Le troubadour Folquet de Marseille (Kraków, Académie des Sciences: 1910).
Patrice Cabau, 'LES ÉVÊQUES DE TOULOUSE (IIIe-XIVe SIÈCLES) ET LES LIEUX DE LEUR SÉPULTURE' in Mémoires de la Société Archéologique du Midi de la France vol. 59 (1999). Online text
N. M. Schulman, Where Troubadours were Bishops: The Occitania of Folc of Marseille (1150–1231), (Routledge, New York: 2001).
Short biography of Folquet de Marselh from the Here of a Sunday Morning radio show on WBAI 99.1 FM, New York.
Folquet de Marseilles from the Encyclopædia Britannica.

1150s births
1231 deaths
Troubadours from Marseille
Bishops of Toulouse
People of the Albigensian Crusade
13th-century French Roman Catholic bishops
12th-century troubadours
13th-century Latin writers
Roman Catholic clergy from Marseille